SX Superstar is a racing video game developed by Climax Solent and published by Acclaim Entertainment for Xbox, GameCube and PlayStation 2.

Modes
Arena involves racing through an arena, usually they have large jumps and sharp turns.
Baja: It is very similar in style to uphill as it has the player going through gates throughout the level, while racing against others.
Stunt: In stunt you attempt to accumulate as many points as you can in the given time.
World Record: This generally has the player attempting to do very difficult things. For example, jumping over the Grand Canyon.
Uphill: Has the player going through gates set throughout the level, an arrow guides the player.

Reception

The game was met with mixed reception.  GameRankings and Metacritic gave it a score of 63% for the PlayStation 2 version; 57% and 59 out of 100 for the GameCube version; and 52% and 53 out of 100 for the Xbox version.

References

External links

2003 video games
Acclaim Entertainment games
Motorcycle video games
GameCube games
Off-road racing video games
PlayStation 2 games
Video games developed in the United Kingdom
Video games scored by Matthew Simmonds
Xbox games